Red Carpet is a community in the southeast quadrant of Calgary, Alberta. It is located at the eastern edge of the city, between the CN tracks, 17 Avenue SE and 68 Street SE. Elliston Park and Elliston Lake, the site of GlobalFest fireworks, are located immediately south of the community.

Demographics

Residents in this community had a median household income of $37,565 in 2000, and there were 25.4% low income residents living in the neighbourhood. As of 2000, 8% of the residents were immigrants. A proportion of 27.5% of the buildings were condominiums or apartments, with the remainder (72.5%) being mobile homes, and 28.9% of the housing was used for renting.

See also
List of neighbourhoods in Calgary

References

External links
Penbrooke Meadows Community Association

Neighbourhoods in Calgary